Marian Tănasă (born 14 August 1985) is a Romanian former footballer who played as a forward for teams such as FCM Bacău, Oțelul Galați or FCMU Baia Mare, among others. After retirement, Tănasă was the coach of women's football club Pisicile Roșii Bacău and since 2017 he is the manager of youth academy Star Bacău. In 2014, when he was still an active player, Tănasă was for a short period the manager of Liga III side Aerostar Bacău.

Honours
Gauss Răcăciuni
Liga IV – Bacău County: 2015–16

References

External links
 
 

1985 births
Living people
Sportspeople from Bacău
Romanian footballers
Association football forwards
Liga I players
Liga II players
FCM Bacău players
ASC Oțelul Galați players
CS Minaur Baia Mare (football) players
FC Politehnica Iași (2010) players
CSM Unirea Alba Iulia players
FC Botoșani players
CS Aerostar Bacău players
Azadegan League players
Aluminium Hormozgan F.C. players
Romanian expatriate footballers
Romanian expatriate sportspeople in Iran
Expatriate footballers in Iran
Romanian football managers
CS Aerostar Bacău managers